Aleksandr Vodovatov is a Soviet sprint canoer who competed from the early to mid-1980s. He won six medals at the ICF Canoe Sprint World Championships with two golds (K-4 500 m: 1981, 1982), three silvers (K-4 500 m: 1983, 1985; K-4 1000 m: 1985), and a bronze (K-4 1000 m: 1983).

References

Living people
Soviet male canoeists
Year of birth missing (living people)
Russian male canoeists
ICF Canoe Sprint World Championships medalists in kayak